Our Redeemer's Christian School is a private Lutheran school in Minot, North Dakota. Founded in 1982, the school serves students in preschool through grade 12 and shares a building with Our Redeemer's Lutheran Brethren Church.

History
Our Redeemer's Lutheran Brethren Church began a kindergarten program in 1976, which led to the establishment of Our Redeemer's Christian School in 1982 with fifteen students. The school became a K-8 program in 1983 and a high school program was added in 1995.

The school is a member of the Association of Christian Schools International (ACSI).

Campus
The school has been housed with the church since the program's establishment. A new classroom and gymnasium building was dedicated in May 2001. The administrative offices, classroom space, chapel, and foyer were renovated in 2009.

Curriculum
The school places a strong focus on a biblical-based curriculum and teaching staff. Our Redeemer's Christian School was also one of the first schools in the state of North Dakota to implement a 7-12 grade Personal Learning Device initiative, with all students being issued their own tablet.

Extracurricular activities
Student activities include band, choir and student congress. The school's athletic teams, known as the Knights, compete in basketball, football (cooperatively with Berthold High School), golf, and volleyball. Students may participate in other sports cooperatively with Minot Public Schools.

References

External links
 
 Our Redeemer's Lutheran Brethren Church

Educational institutions established in 1982
Private elementary schools in North Dakota
Private high schools in North Dakota
Lutheran schools in North Dakota
Private middle schools in North Dakota
Schools in Ward County, North Dakota
1982 establishments in North Dakota
Church of the Lutheran Brethren of America